Pothanur Thabal Nilayam is a 2022 Indian Tamil-language heist film written and directed by Praveen. The film features Praveen himself in the lead role, Anjali Rao and Venkat Sundar, and was released on 27 May 2022.

Cast

Production 
Praveen Venkataraman began writing Pothanur Thabal Nilayam in the early 2010s. The film, set in the 1990s, focuses on the Podanur Post Office, the oldest and the first post office in Coimbatore, that has been functioning since 1886.

Praveen gained experience in filmmaking animation, by notably working as a technical director with Walt Disney Pictures and was a pipeline director on Soundarya Rajinikanth's Kochadaiiyaan (2014). Production on Pothanur Thabal Nilayam began by August 2015, with Praveen putting together a technical team of young short filmmakers from Coimbatore to assist him. The film was launched under his own studio – Bicycle Cinemas – and took five years to complete. Scenes were shot at Coimbatore Town Hall, which was redesigned to look like a post office. The film was shot across Tamil Nadu and Kerala.

In November 2021, Passion Studios acquired the film and announced intentions of making the film into a trilogy.

Reception 
The film was released on 27 May 2022 on the streaming platform, aha. A reviewer from Cinema Express gave the film a negative review noting "director Praveen treats the film like an uninventive drama from the 80s, by topping it with cartoonish performances, overlong shots, and a jarring background score". The film received a middling review from The Hindu.

In contrast, IndiaGlitz gave the film a positive review citing it was an "innovative crime drama that impresses with its nostalgia" and "to go for this minimalistic experimental film that will surprise you with its entertainment quotient". Similarly, News Today also gave the film a positive review noted that "Praveen does a commendable job. He impresses not just as actor and filmmaker but also as art director. Anjali Rao does a super show." Behindwoods.com also praised the film noting "Overall, Pothanur Thabal Nilayam is an honest heist thriller that has got most of the elements right."Dinamalar critic gave mixture of reviews and gave 2.5 rating out of 5

References

External links 

2020s heist films
2020s Tamil-language films
2022 crime drama films
2022 films
Aha (streaming service) original films
Indian crime drama films
Indian heist films